Pandanallur is a Suburban of Kumbakonam in the Thiruvidaimarudur taluk of Thanjavur district. It is north of Aduthurai. Pandanallur is a historically important village and is known for its Pasupatiswarar Temple and Adikesava Perumal temple. The Pandanallur style of Bharatanatyam also traces its origin to Pandanallur.

Demographics

The Pandanallur village has population of 4680 of which 2370 are males while 2310 are females with total of 1146 families residing. Average Sex Ratio of Pandanallur village is 975 which is lower than Tamil Nadu state average of 996. Child Sex Ratio for the Pandanallur as per census is 917, lower than Tamil Nadu average of 943. The children(0-6) form 10.32% of total population. Pandanallur village has lower literacy rate compared to Tamil Nadu. In 2011, literacy rate of Pandanallur village was 79.49% compared to 80.09% of Tamil Nadu. In Pandanallur Male literacy stands at 84.56% while female literacy rate was 74.31%.

Transport

See also
Thiruppanandal
Manalmedu
Serukadambur
Anaikkarai

References

Sources 
 

Villages in Thanjavur district